Yan Jiankui (born 19 March 1976) is a retired female sprinter from PR China. She competed in the 100 metres and the 200 metres at the 1996 Summer Olympics.

In 1998 she won both the 100 metres and 200 metres the Asian Championships and as well as a bronze medal in the 200 m at the Asian Games. She was selected to represent Asia at the 1998 World Cup, but finished eighth and last in both events. Later she won a bronze medal in the 200 m at the 2002 Asian Championships.

She also competed at the 1997 World Indoor Championships and the 1997 World Championships without reaching the final. However, she finished eighth at the 1997 World Championships with the 4 x 100 metres relay team.

Her personal best times were both achieved in 1998. She ran the 100 m in 11.22 seconds in Beijing and the 200 m in 22.85 seconds in Shijiazhuang.

Achievements

References

External links
 

1976 births
Living people
Chinese female sprinters
Asian Games medalists in athletics (track and field)
Athletes (track and field) at the 1998 Asian Games
Athletes (track and field) at the 2002 Asian Games
Universiade medalists in athletics (track and field)
Athletes (track and field) at the 1996 Summer Olympics
Olympic athletes of China
Asian Games gold medalists for China
Asian Games bronze medalists for China
Medalists at the 1998 Asian Games
Medalists at the 2002 Asian Games
Universiade gold medalists for China
People from Wuzhou
Runners from Guangxi
Medalists at the 2001 Summer Universiade
Olympic female sprinters